Threshold is a 1981 Canadian drama/science fiction film directed by Richard Pearce and starring Donald Sutherland and Jeff Goldblum. The film was nominated for ten Genie Awards in 1983 and won two of them. Sutherland also won best actor at the 1982 Karlovy Vary International Film Festival for his performance. Threshold was filmed on location at the then newly constructed Ottawa General Hospital.

Plot

Respected cardiac surgeon Dr. Thomas Vrain performs a risky operation to provide a patient with the first artificial heart ever implanted in a human subject.

He and his colleague, research scientist Dr. Aldo Gehring, consider the risks and weigh the odds as time runs out for Carol Severance, the patient. Severance will die unless the experimental surgery is done quickly and succeeds.

Cast
 Donald Sutherland as Dr. Thomas Vrain
 Jeff Goldblum as Dr. Aldo Gehring
 Sharon Acker as Tilla Vrain
 Mare Winningham as Carol Severance
 John Marley as Edgar Fine
 Allan Nicholls as Dr. Basil Rents

References

External links

1981 films
Canadian science fiction films
English-language Canadian films
Films directed by Richard Pearce
Films scored by Maribeth Solomon
Films scored by Micky Erbe
1980s English-language films
1980s Canadian films